From I Extreme II Another is the second and final studio album by the group, II D Extreme. The album was released on October 29, 1996 for MCA Records and was executive produced by D'Extra Wiley, and Brandon Randy Phillips. All songs were written or co-written by D'Extra Wiley. Two singles made it to the Billboard charts, "If I Knew Then (What I Know Now)" and "You Got Me Goin'" but neither made it high on the charts. The album was met with mixed reviews and was a commercial failure, not making it on any Billboard charts due to the sudden dissolution of their parent record label.

Track listing
"Prelude (Just Understand)" - 2:52
"You Got Me Goin'" - 4:05
"You Can Have My Love" - 4:59
"If I Knew Then (What I Know Now)" - 4:49
"Farewell...Love" - 2:26
"Love You Too Much" - 5:13
"Lyin' Here Thinkin'" - 4:55
"Intermission" - 4:59
"Sticks & Stones" - 5:21
"Shoulders" - 5:03
"If Push Comes to Shove" - 4:59
"Seasons (Of Love)" - 4:59
"Become as One" - 4:33
"Slowly But Surely (I'm Falling in Love)" - 5:08
"Postlude (Love You Completely)" - 2:59

References

II D Extreme albums
1996 albums
MCA Records albums